Thomas Portway (by 1524 – 1557), of Dover, Kent, was an English politician.

He was a Member of Parliament (MP) for Dover in March 1553. He was mayor of Dover from 1550 to 1551.

References

1557 deaths
Members of the Parliament of England for Dover
English MPs 1553 (Edward VI)
Year of birth uncertain
Mayors of Dover